Isopenicillin N synthase (IPNS) is a non-heme iron protein belonging to the 2-oxoglutarate (2OG)-dependent dioxygenases oxidoreductase family.  This enzyme catalyzes the formation of isopenicillin N from δ-(L-α-aminoadipoyl)-L-cysteinyl-D-valine (LLD-ACV).

N-[(5S)-5-amino-5-carboxypentanoyl]-L-cysteinyl-D-valine + O2  isopenicillin N + 2 H2O

This reaction is a key step in the biosynthesis of penicillin and cephalosporin antibiotics.

The active sites of most isopenicillin N synthases contain an iron ion.

This enzyme is also called isopenicillin N synthetase.

Mechanism

A Fe(II) metal ion in the active site of the enzyme is coordinated by at least two histidine residues, an aspartate residue, a glutamine residue, and two water molecules in the absence of a bound substrate.  Just two histidine residues and one aspartic acid residue are entirely conserved.  Therefore, it is highly significant that these two histidine residues, His214 and His270, and one aspartic acid residue, Asp216, are precisely the ones essential for activity.  When ACV binds the active site, Gln330 and one water molecule are replaced by the ACV thiolate.

The linear tripeptide δ-(L-α-aminoadipoyl)-L-cysteinyl-D-valine (LLD-ACV) must first be assembled from its component amino acids by N-(5-amino-5-carboxypentanoyl)-L-cysteinyl-D-valine synthase (ACV synthase).  This allows for the binding of the substrate ACV to the deprotonated thiol group of the cysteine residue.  This ligation of the thiolate to the iron center anchors the ACV within the active site.

The ligation of ACV results in a decrease in the FeII/FeIII redox potential, which facilitates the reduction of dioxygen to superoxide.  Formation of a highly covalent RS-FeIII bond lowers the activation barrier to dioxygen binding, thereby initiating the reaction cycle.  An intramolecular hydrogen atom transfer from C-3 of the cysteine residue (BDE= 93 kcal/mol) to the distal superoxo oxygen takes place, thereby converting the FeIII back to the FeII oxidation state.  A thioaldehyde and a hydroperoxy ligand (OOH) are produced in this process.  The hydroperoxy ligand deprotonates the amide which then closes the β-lactam ring by a nucleophilic attack at the thioaldehyde carbon.

This causes the hydrogen atom at the C-3 of the valine residue to come closer to the iron(IV) oxo ligand which is highly electrophilic.  A second hydrogen transfer occurs, most likely producing an isopropyl radical which closes the thiazolidine ring by attacking the thiolate sulfur atom.

Role in Antibiotic Formation

Following the IPNS pathway, further enzymes are responsible for the epimerization of isopenicillin N to penicillin N, the derivitazation to other penicillins, and the ring expansion that eventually leads to the various cephalosporins.

This shows how IPNS occupies an early and key role in the biosynthetic pathway of all of the penicillins and cephalosporins, which are different types of β-lactam antibiotics.  This class of antibiotics is the most widely used.  They act by inhibiting the synthesis of the peptidoglycan layer of bacterial cell walls, which is especially important in Gram-positive organisms.

There are several types of penicillins that can be used to treat different kinds of bacterial infections.  They will not work for infections caused by viruses, such as colds or the flu.

Structural studies

References

Further reading

 
 

EC 1.21.3
Enzymes of known structure